KTKU (105.1 FM, "Taku 105") is a radio station in Juneau, Alaska. Owned by Alaska Broadcast Communications, it broadcasts a country music format.

Its studios are located alongside its sister stations at 3161 Channel Drive.

History 
KTKU signed on in 1984 as the first commercial FM station in Juneau with a top 40 format, under the ownership of KJNO owner Roy Paschal. Dennis Egan, the former mayor of Juneau and Juneau's current state senator, was the station's first general manager, while Rick Rydell served as the morning show host.

The station has since switched to country.

References

External links

1984 establishments in Alaska
Country radio stations in the United States
Radio stations established in 1984
TKU